Dehi is a village in Dohuk Governorate in Kurdistan Region, Iraq. It is located in the Sapna valley in the district of Amadiya.

In the village, there are churches of Mart Shmune, Mar Gewargis, and Mar Qayouma.

History
The church of Mart Shmune was constructed in the 5th century, and the church of Mar Qayouma was built in the 10th century. It is likely that the population of Dehi were adherents of the Church of the East long before the 14th century. In 1850, 10 Assyrian families inhabited Dehi, and had one functioning church as part of the diocese of Barwari.

In the aftermath of the Assyrian genocide, Assyrians from the Upper Tyari clan found refuge and settled at Dehi in 1920. The population decreased from 140 Assyrian people in 1933 to 29 people in 1938. The Iraqi census of 1957 recorded 292 inhabitants, and this grew to 615 people, with 100 families, by 1961. The eruption of the Iraqi–Kurdish conflict in 1961 resulted in severe damage to the village in the following years, and eventually was destroyed during the Al-Anfal campaign in 1988, forcing the 50 remaining families to flee.

20 families returned after the establishment of the Iraqi no-fly zones in the aftermath of the 1991 uprisings in Iraq. In 2003, it was reported they had suffered from illegal confiscation of land by Kurds. The Supreme Committee of Christian Affairs had constructed 56 houses and developed the village's infrastructure by 2012, in which year Dehi was inhabited by 250 adherents of the Assyrian Church of the East. On the night of 13 July 2016, the village was seriously damaged by a fire; it was noted by villagers that Kurdistan Region firefighters arrived, but made no effort to quench the fire.

Gallery

References
Notes

Citations

Bibliography

 
 
 
 
 
 

Populated places in Dohuk Province
Assyrian communities in Iraq